Miss Brazil 2019, officially Miss Brazil Be Emotion 2019, was the 65th edition of the Miss Brazil beauty pageant which held on 9 March 2019 at São Paulo Expo Exhibition & Convention Center in the city of São Paulo, Brazil. The event was broadcast by Rede Bandeirantes network nationally. 27 candidates from all the each States of Brazil and the Federal District participated in the pageant. At the end of the event, Mayra Dias of Amazonas crowned Júlia Horta of Minas Gerais as her successor. Horta represented Brazil at Miss Universe 2019 pageant and placed Top 20.

Results

Challenge events

Miss Internet

Special Award

Contestants

The following is the list of the official delegates of Miss Brazil 2019 representing each states of the country:

Judges

Preliminary
 Karina Ades – Miss Brazil national director
 Daniele da Mata – Businesswoman and beauty artist
 Priscila Prade – Photographer

Finals
 Alexandre Herchcovitch - Stylist
Marcos Proença - Beauty stylist
Wanderley Nunes - Beauty stylist
Luíza Brunet - Businesswoman, activist, and model
Rachel Maia - CEO of Lacoste
Natália Guimarães - Businesswoman and Miss Brasil 2007 from Minas Gerais
Mônica Salgado - Journalist
Taciele Alcolea - YouTuber
Ricky Hiraoka - Journalist
Leila Schuster - Businesswoman, model, and Miss Brasil 1993 from Rio Grande do Sul

References

External links

 Official Miss Brasil website

2019
2019 in Brazil
2019 beauty pageants
Beauty pageants in Brazil